The Gioenian Academy (italian: Accademia Gioenia) is a scientific and academic society in Catania, Italy, that was founded in 1824. Today it is closely associated with the University of Catania.

Origins
The academy of natural sciences, which had been conceived by the naturalist Giuseppe Gioeni d'Angiò (1743-1822), was founded in 1824 on the initiative of the knight hospitaller Cesare Borgia, who lived in Catania due to the well-known events of the Order, and ten intellectuals and scientists, among which were Carlo Gemmellaro. The academy had its initial meeting in 1824 at the Palazzo Centrale dell'Università di Catania.

The initial organization separated two sections, both mainly focused on events observable in Sicily: a section of Storia Naurale (Natural History) and one of Scienze Fisiche. The latter often focused on the particular geology and vulcanology of Sicily, but also on metereological observations. It has published for decades a scientific journal.

References

University of Catania
1824 establishments in Italy
Learned societies of Italy
Educational institutions established in 1824